Flåm Church is a parish church of the Church of Norway in Aurland Municipality in Vestland county, Norway. It is located in the village of Flåm. It is the church for the Flåm parish which is part of the Sogn prosti (deanery) in the Diocese of Bjørgvin. The brown, wooden church was built in a long church design in 1670 by master builder Magne Essen using designs by an unknown architect. The church seats about 160 people.

History
The earliest existing historical records of the church date back to the year 1340, but the church was not new that year. The first church in Flåm was likely a wooden stave church that was located on the same site as the present-day church. By 1661, the church was described as being in miserable condition. The parish hired master builder Magne Essen to tear down the old stave church and to build a new one on the same site, reusing as much of the old materials as possible. The builder, however, did not do that. Unfortunately, the new church was significantly damaged in a wind storm the following year in 1669. So then, in 1670, both churches (the medieval stave church and the new church) were torn down and the materials from the two churches were reused in the building of a new church on the site of the old stave church. In 1926, the tower and church porch were both rebuilt and the exterior siding was painted a dark brown.

Media gallery

See also
List of churches in Bjørgvin

References

Aurland
Churches in Vestland
Long churches in Norway
Wooden churches in Norway
17th-century Church of Norway church buildings
Churches completed in 1670
13th-century establishments in Norway